Quatsino Sound is a complex of coastal inlets, bays and islands on northwestern Vancouver Island in the Canadian province of British Columbia. It is the northernmost of the five sounds that pierce the west coast of Vancouver Island, the others being Kyuquot Sound, Nootka Sound, Clayoquot Sound, and Barkley Sound.

Geography
Quatsino Sound extends east from the Pacific Ocean. Near its entrance, on the north side, is Forward Inlet, which branches into several smaller inlets, including the Winter Harbour and village of Winter Harbour. Koskimo Bay and Koprino Harbour are located farther east into Quatsino Sound. Drake Island, which is named after Justice Montague Tyrwhitt-Drake, (Mayor of Victoria 1876-1877) lies near the eastern end of Quatsino Sound, and the long Neroutsos Inlet extends southeast from Drake Island. The town of Port Alice lies near the end of Neroutsos Inlet. East of Drake Island, Quatsino Narrows connects the eastern end of Quatsino Sound to Holberg Inlet and the smaller Rupert Inlet. Quatsino Narrows is a tidal rapids (which are also known in British Columbia as skookumchucks), with currents reaching  during flood tide. The sound is located within the Regional District of Mount Waddington.

See also
List of fjords in Canada
Quatsino First Nation
Quatsino Provincial Park
British Columbia Coast

References

External links

Fjords of British Columbia
Quatsino Sound region
Sounds of British Columbia